Nicolai N. Petro is the Silvia-Chandley Professor of Peace Studies and Nonviolence (2017-2019) and Professor of Political Science at the University of Rhode Island, in the United States. He also served as the US State Department's special assistant for policy on the Soviet Union under President George HW Bush.

Life and professional career
Petro received his B.A. summa cum laude in history in 1980, M.A. in public administration in 1982, and Ph.D. in foreign affairs in 1984 all from the University of Virginia.  His first full-time teaching appointment was at the Monterey Institute of International Studies, where in 1987 he founded the Center for Contemporary Russian Studies.

In 1989 and 1990, as an International Affairs fellow of the Council on Foreign Relations, he served as special assistant for policy in the Office of Soviet Union Affairs in the U.S. Department of State, and as temporary political attache at the U.S. Embassy in Moscow. While in the Soviet Union he monitored local elections in central Russia, Belarus, and Latvia. In 2001-2002 he returned to Russia privately to serve as staff consultant to the municipal research and training center Dialog, and advisor to the mayor of the Russian city of Veliky Novgorod.

His postdoctoral awards include two Fulbright awards (one to Russia and one to Ukraine), a Thornton D. Hooper International Affairs Fellowship at the Foreign Policy Research Institute, and research awards from the National Council for Eurasian and East European Research, the Kennan Institute for Advanced Russian Studies in Washington, D.C., and the Hoover Institution at Stanford University. In 1997 Yaroslav-the-Wise Novgorod State University awarded him an honorary doctorate for "great merit in the development of the University and an outstanding contribution to the Science, Culture and Education of the Land of Novgorod." In 2007 and 2013 he participated in the Valdai Discussion Club, a gathering of Russian specialists who meet annually with that country’s top political leadership. In 2008 he spoke at the first international security conference of the Ukrainian Forum in Kiev. In 2012 he was invited to advise the World Economic Forum in Davos, Switzerland on its "Scenarios for the Russian Federation" initiative.

He has published in The American Interest, Asia Times, Boston Globe, International Herald Tribune, The Guardian (UK), New York Times, Washington Times, Wilson Quarterly, Comparative Strategy, Post-Soviet Affairs, The Nation, The National Interest, Whitehead Journal of Diplomacy, World Development, Fletcher Forum, and Harvard International Review. His articles in Russian have appeared in the monthly of the Russian Supreme Soviet, Rodina, the social sciences quarterlies of the Russian Academy of Sciences ONS and Polis, and the journal of the Institute for International Economy and International Relations, MEiMO.
He has also made appearances on the television network RT.

Works 
 Crafting Democracy: How Novgorod has Coped with Rapid Social Change (Cornell University Press, 2004)
 Russian Foreign Policy: From Empire to Nation-State co-authored with Alvin Z. Rubinstein (Longman, 1997)
 The Rebirth of Russian Democracy: An Interpretation of Political Culture (Harvard, 1995)

Awards
2006-2007: URI Center for the Humanities Faculty Sabbatical Fellowship, for his project "Will East Meet West, The Role of Orthodox Politics in the New Europe".

References

External links 
  Nicolai N. Petro's website

Living people
American educators
1958 births
Russian studies scholars